Seat bias is a property describing methods of apportionment. These are methods used to allocate seats in a parliament among federal states or among political parties. A method is biased if it systematically favors small parties over large parties, or vice versa. There are various ways to compute the bias of apportionment methods.

When the agents are federal states, it is particularly important to avoid bias between large states and small states. There are several ways to measure this bias formally.

Notation 
There is a positive integer  (=house size), representing the total number of seats to allocate. There is a positive integer  representing the number of parties to which seats should be allocated. This is usually the fraction of votes that this party has won in the elections.

Pairwise comparison of methods 

Therefore, Adams' method favors small parties more than Dean's, more than Hill's, more than Webster's, more than Jefferson's.

This fact can be expressed using the majorization ordering on integer vectors. A vector a seats majorizes another vector b, if for all k, the k largest parties receive in a at least as many seats as they receive in b. An apportionment method  majorizes another method , if for any house-size and entitlement-vector,  majorizes . Therefore, Adams' is majorized by Dean's, majorized by Hill's, majorized by Webster's, majorized by Jefferson's.

The shifted-quota method (largest-remainders method) with quota  are also ordered by majorization, where methods with smaller s are majorized by methods with larger s.

Counting over all house sizes 
To measure the bias of a certain apportionment method M, one can check, for each pair of entitlements , the set of all possible apportionments yielded by M, for all possible house sizes. Theoretically, the number of possible house sizes is infinite, but since  are usually rational numbers, it is sufficient to check the house sizes up to the product of their denominators. The only unbiased method, by this definition, is Webster's method.

Averaging over all entitlement-pairs 
One can also check, for each pair of possible allocations , the set of all entitlement-pairs  for which the method M yields the allocations  (for ). Assuming the entitlements are distributed uniformly at random, one can compute the probability that M favors state 1 vs. the probability that it favors state 2. For example, the probability that a state receiving 2 seats is favored over a state receiving 4 seats is 75% for Adams, 63.5% for Dean, 57% for Hill, 50% for Webster, and 25% for Jefferson. The unique proportional divisor method for which this probability is always 50% is Webster. There are other divisor methods yielding a probability of 50%, but they do not satisfy the criterion of proportionality as defined in the "Basic requirements" section above. The same result holds if, instead of checking pairs of agents, we check pairs of groups of agents.

Averaging over all entitlement-vectors 
One can also check, for each vector of entitlements (each point in the standard simplex), what is the seat bias of the agent with the k-th highest entitlement. Averaging this number over the entire standard simplex gives a seat bias formula.

For divisor methods 
For each divisor method with divisor , where there is an electoral threshold :

In particular, Webster's method is the only unbiased one in this family. The formula is applicable when the house size is sufficiently large, particularly, when . When the threshold is negligible, the third term can be ignored. Then, the sum of mean biases is:

Since the mean bias favors large parties when , there is an incentive for small parties to form party alliances (=coalitions). Such alliances can tip the bias in their favor. The seat-bias formula can be extended to settings with such alliances.

For shifted-quota methods 
For each shifted-quota method (largest-remainders method) with quota , when entitlement vectors are drawn uniformly at random from the standard simplex,

In particular, Hamilton's method is the only unbiased one in this family.

Simulations 
In addition to the theoretic analysis, one can check the actual bias in real problems. Using the USA census data, it was found that the ratio of favoring the larger state over the smaller state for Webster's method is nearest to 50% among all common divisor methods. Many other tests indicate that Webster's method is the least biased.

References 

Apportionment method criteria